(English: The Human Voice) is a forty-minute, one-act opera for soprano and orchestra composed by Francis Poulenc in 1958. The work is based on the play of the same name by Jean Cocteau, who, along with French soprano Denise Duval, worked closely with Poulenc in preparation for the opera's premiere. Poulenc's  was first performed at the Théâtre National de l'Opéra-Comique in Paris on 6 February 1959, with Duval as the solo singer and Georges Prêtre conducting; the scenery, costumes and direction were by Cocteau.

The libretto consists of a woman's last phone conversation with her lover, who now loves someone else. During the call, the woman reveals that she has attempted suicide because her lover has abandoned her.

History

Cocteau's play
Cocteau finished writing La voix humaine in 1928, and the monodrama was premiered two years later. Having been previously criticized for using mechanical effects in his plays, Cocteau sought to reduce his drama to the "simplest of forms". Indeed, the one-act play involves a single character in a single room with a telephone. The character — an anonymous woman referred to only as "Elle" ("she" in French) — has been abandoned by her lover and reveals that she has attempted to commit suicide. The play consists of her last conversation with her lover. As a one-act play, the drama lacks the breaks that would traditionally determine its structure. Instead, Cocteau suggests that the actress's different poses represent different "phases" of the monologue. The structure of the play is further delineated by the phone cutting off frequently without warning.

Motivation
Upon the success of his second opera Dialogues des Carmélites in 1957, Poulenc was encouraged to compose more works in the genre. Hervé Dugardin, the Paris director of Ricordi Publishers, suggested that Poulenc set Cocteau's monodrama to music, with Maria Callas singing the role of Elle. Poulenc, however, wrote the opera specifically for Denise Duval, who had starred as Blanche de la Force in the Paris Opéra premiere of Dialogues. Poulenc's close work with Duval helped his compositional process because he "knew the details of the soprano's stormy love life, and this helped to cultivate a sense of specificity in the opera." Poulenc also identified with Elle's situation, which allowed him to "pour immense anguish into his opera… Like her he abused sleeping pills, tranquilizers and anti-depressants." He thus immersed himself in a deeply personal project with which he easily connected.

Adapting Cocteau's text
Poulenc met Cocteau early in his career because of the latter's close relationship with Les Six, a group of six French composers of which Poulenc was a member. The two maintained a close friendship throughout their lives, but Poulenc did not set many of Cocteau's texts prior the composition of La voix humaine, about forty years after their first encounter. Poulenc himself explained that he waited so many years to set Cocteau's play because he felt that he needed a great deal of experience to perfectly construct such a work.

In composing , Poulenc strove to maintain the emotional effectiveness of Cocteau's original drama. He very carefully adapted Cocteau's text, omitting only those passages that he believed would reduce the emotional tension of the opera. In his article on Poulenc and Cocteau, Denis Waleckx proposes that there are five types of "phases" in Cocteau's play. These phases deal with chronology, psychological evolution, social interaction, telephone problems, and the "remembrance of past happiness". Poulenc left the chronology, telephone problem, and past happiness phases mostly intact, but cut down on or entirely omitted many of the psychological or social phases. This resulted in a protagonist who was "quieter, more modest, less hysterical, less unbearable, and thereby probably more touching than Cocteau's." Poulenc thereby focused on the relationship of the woman and her lover, while still retaining the key points and overall character of Cocteau's play.

Collaboration
Poulenc viewed the soprano singing the role of Elle as "a co-composer" of the part. Because Poulenc wrote the role specifically for Duval, the French soprano was his original "co-composer". Duval also helped Poulenc with his adaptation of Cocteau's text. Upon the opera's completion, Poulenc and Duval visited Cocteau, who was responsible for directing and designing costumes and stage décor for the premiere. Cocteau worked closely with Duval and adapted his directions for lighting and costuming to complement her physical attributes.

Premiere
Poulenc finished his score for voice and piano on 2 June 1958 and spent the next two months orchestrating the work, completing the version for full orchestra on 7 August 1958. The tragédie-lyrique was premiered on 6 February 1959 at the Opéra-Comique, Paris, with Georges Prêtre conducting and Duval performing the role of Elle. The opera met immediate success and went on to be performed at La Scala in Milan, as well as in Portugal, Britain, and the United States.

Synopsis

The curtain opens to reveal a bedroom where a woman (Elle) lies unmoving on the ground. Elle changes position once before finally rising. Although Elle makes to leave the room, the phone rings and Elle returns to answer it. Elle receives two wrong numbers before her ex-lover is able to get through to her. Elle lies to him, saying that she went out with her friend Marthe the previous night, and that she took one pill to help her fall asleep when she returned. The couple discusses their past relationship, and Elle blames herself for their problems, claiming, "Tout est ma faute." Throughout their conversation, they experience numerous telephone problems, and their connection finally cuts out completely. When Elle calls her lover's home phone, she discovers that he is not there and assumes that he is at a restaurant. He calls her back, and Elle reveals that she has lied during their conversation; instead of going out with Marthe the previous night, she took twelve sleeping pills in an attempted suicide. She then called Marthe, who arrived with a doctor to save her. Elle suddenly hears music in the background, and grows suspicious that her lover is at the home of his new girlfriend. Elle expresses her suspicions to him several times until the end of the opera, but he never admits to his true location. Elle also reveals her obsession with the telephone, explaining that she has slept with it in her bed for the past two nights. Their connection fails once again, and Elle panics. Her lover calls her back once more, and Elle informs him that she now has the telephone cord wrapped around her neck. Telling him she loves him over and over, she sinks into her bed and drops the receiver.

Instrumentation
La voix humaine is scored for full symphony orchestra with reduced dimensions, so that the sung text is easily understandable. The entire orchestra rarely plays at once; such moments occur only when the soprano does not sing, or when her voice lyrically rises above the orchestra. Poulenc writes coloristically, using different combinations of instruments to achieve certain effects. The instrumentation listed in Poulenc's score is as follows:
2 flutes (2nd doubling piccolo)
1 oboe
1 English horn
2 clarinets in B-flat
1 bass clarinet
2 bassoons
2 horns
2 trumpets in C
1 trombone
1 tuba
1 percussion: timpani, cymbals, tambourine, xylophone
1 harp
strings (violins 1 and 2, viola, cello, contrabass)

Version with piano accompaniment
Poulenc did not sanction public performances of the opera in the version with piano accompaniment during his lifetime. In the 2010s, Rosine Seringe, Poulenc's niece, gave dispensation to Felicity Lott and Graham Johnson to record a performance for DVD of the piano accompaniment version, which appeared in 2013 as the first commercial recording of this version. Subsequently, recordings and live performances of the piano accompaniment version of the opera have increased in frequency.

Musical structure

Treatment of the voice

Poulenc's writing for the voice is recitative-like in style, representing the natural inflections of speech and, in the case of this particular drama, imitating a phone conversation through its frequent pauses and silences. Poulenc rejects his previous lyricism, opting for a fragmentary, declamatory approach to the voice. Common characteristics of Poulenc's vocal lines include multiple repeated notes, few intervals greater than a fifth, much step-wise motion and motion by a third, and rhythm and accents designed to reflect actual speech patterns, especially "the pauses and hesitations of a phone conversation." Keith W. Daniel notes that out of the 780 measures of music in Poulenc's work, 186 are for solo voice without orchestral accompaniment, adding to the impression of a real telephone conversation. Many of the techniques described above are present in Example 1.

Poulenc strays from the recitative in highly dramatic passages, including when Elle sings of her suicide attempt of the previous night. This section is more lyrical and tonal, as can be seen in Example 2. Here, the vocal line more resembles an aria, especially as it builds toward its high point in the nine-eight measure, and the orchestra accompanies the voice in a waltz. The harmony, meanwhile, is a dominant prolongation in C (minor), and indeed, the orchestra resolves to C (major) in the following measure. Poulenc's vocal writing shows a strong dedication to maintaining the dramatic effect of Cocteau's text. The recitative-like passages clearly deliver the libretto, while the aria-like passages illustrate the soprano's passion and anguish.

Treatment of the orchestra

Poulenc uses the orchestra to connect the soprano's fragmented vocal lines, unifying the piece as a whole. Unlike his treatment of the soprano voice, Poulenc gives the orchestra many lyrical motifs, writing in the preface his score, "L'œuvre entière doit baigner dans la plus grande sensualité orchestrale" ("The entire work must bathe in the largest orchestral sensuality"). He unifies the opera through these motifs, of which Denis Waleckx identifies fourteen. These motifs relate to Elle's state of mind, such as those representing her "exasperated waiting," and to situations out of her control, such as her "happy memory." The first of these motifs is shown in Example 3.

Daniel, however, suggests that only nine of Waleckx's examples are true motifs, while the remaining one- or two-bar phrases employ a cellular technique in which a short phrase is presented, then repeated once or twice. What Waleckx cites as the "Endurance" motif (see Example 4), Daniel uses to illustrate Poulenc's cellular technique. Despite their different interpretations, both authors agree that the primary function of the orchestra is to unify the opera into a cohesive work. As Daniel explains, "If La voix humaine succeeds as a drama, it is because of the vocal writing; but if it succeeds as a piece of music, as an opera, it is because of the orchestra."

Other functions of the orchestra include the representation of Elle's agitation while trying to reach her lover and the jazz she hears on her lover's side of the phone conversation. Musicologist and professor Michal Grover-Friedlander also suggests that the orchestral music can symbolize the lover's side of the phone conversation. Perhaps the most important orchestral function other than unifying the overall work is the portrayal of the telephone ringing through repeated sixteenth notes on the xylophone, shown in Example 5. Although the pitch and the duration of the ringing changes throughout the opera, the timbre of the xylophone is only ever used to represent the "voice" of the telephone, making it easily identifiable. The phone cutting off and re-ringing divides the opera into natural sections and creates a comprehensible structure through which the audience understands the drama. The orchestra is therefore essential to unifying and organizing the opera.

Use of tonality
La voix humaine stands out from Poulenc's previous works because it is marked by a certain tonal ambiguity. Poulenc achieves this sensation through the avoidance of traditional harmonic functions and the preponderance of unresolved dissonances, diminished structures, and progressions of chromatically-related chords. Although some passages—most often those in which the voice becomes more lyrical—have a clear tonal center, the tonally ambiguous sections are much more frequent in Poulenc's score. Grover-Friedlander suggests that the music is motivically, rather than tonally, driven. Yet in these motives, she identifies a number of tonal references, including "half steps or leading notes, sevenths, or appoggiaturas, which raise expectations for tonal functioning and tonal resolutions. Poulenc's motivic, cell-like aesthetics does not undermine a sense of totality, but treats it as constantly deferred, or in motion." Poulenc thereby uses tonal techniques in a more modern, tonally ambiguous harmonic language.

Selected discography

Standard version with orchestra
 Denise Duval; Orchestre du Théâtre National de l'Opéra-Comique, Georges Prêtre. EMI (1959)
 Wenche Foss; Norwegian Radio Orchestra, Øivin Fjeldstad. (Full title: Stemmen / La voix humaine. Norwegian libretto by Pauline Hall. TV movie. See link below.) NRK. CD. 1963.
 Jane Rhodes. Orchestre National de France. Jean-Pierre Marty. INA Mémoire vive IMV015 (1976).
 Carole Farley. Adelaide Symphony Orchestra. José Serebrier. Varèse Sarabande. CD (1981)
 Carole Farley. Scottish Chamber Orchestra. José Serebrier. (Full title: Poulenc: La voix humaine; Menotti: The Telephone. Newman movie.) VAI (DVD, 1990)
 Julia Migenes. Orchestre National de France. Georges Prêtre (director: Peter Medak). Kultur. DVD (1990)
 Françoise Pollet. Orchestre National de Lille. Jean-Claude Casadesus. Harmonia Mundi. CD (1992)
 Pauline Vaillancourt. Orchestre Chants libres. Jean-Eudes Vaillancourt. SNE. CD. 1995.
 Felicity Lott. Orchestre de la Suisse Romande. Armin Jordan. (Full title: La voix humaine; La dame de Monte-Carlo.) Harmonia Mundi (2001)
 Jessye Norman. Orchestre de Paris. David Robertson. (Live in Paris). Premiere Opera (2002)
 Anne-Sophie Schmidt. Orchestre Ostinato. Jean-Claude Casadesus. Kultur (DVD, 2005)
 Barbara Hannigan. Orchestre de l'Opéra national de Paris. Esa-Pekka Salonen. Arthaus Musik (DVD, 2018)

Piano version
 Felicity Lott, Graham Johnson. Champs Hill Records (DVD, 2013)
 , Jean-Christophe Rigaud. Ad Vitam (CD, 2017)
 Daniela Mazzucato, Marco Scolastra. Brilliant Classics (CD, 2019)

Notes, references and sources
Notes

References

Sources

External links

La voix humaine, Operabase

Stemmen (La voix humaine), NRK 2015

1959 operas
Adaptations of works by Jean Cocteau
French-language operas
Monodrama
One-act operas
Opera world premieres at the Opéra-Comique
Operas by Francis Poulenc
Operas
Songs about telephone calls